Ahmed Hamed (born 1 June 1997) is an Egyptian modern pentathlete. He competed in the men's event at the 2020 Summer Olympics.

References

External links
 

1997 births
Living people
Egyptian male modern pentathletes
Modern pentathletes at the 2020 Summer Olympics
Olympic modern pentathletes of Egypt
Place of birth missing (living people)
World Modern Pentathlon Championships medalists
20th-century Egyptian people
21st-century Egyptian people